Cyclophora frenaria is a moth in the  family Geometridae. It is found in the Indo-Australian tropics from India to New Guinea and Queensland.

Adults are grey with dark markings, including a black-outlined dark circular spot near the center of each wing.

Larvae have been reared on Uvaria species.

References

Moths described in 1857
Cyclophora (moth)
Moths of Asia
Moths of Australia